Wyoming Highway 172 (WYO 172) is a  Wyoming state road located in Hot Springs County northeast of Thermopolis and serves the various oil fields in the eastern part of the county.

Route description
Wyoming Highway 172 begins its west end at US 20/WYO 789 in the community of Lucerne, roughly 6 miles north of Thermopolis. Highway 172, named Black Mountain Road, travels east and crosses the Bighorn River at just under 8 tenths of a mile. Past the Bighorn, WYO 173 crosses Kirby Creek and will run along the north side, paralleling, for the remainder of its routing. At 11.26 miles, Highway 172 reaches its eastern terminus at Hot Springs County Route 6 (Black Mountain Road) near the Zimmerman Oil and Butte Gas Fields. CR 6 continues further eastward, just south of the Washakie County line, to the Kirby Creek, Murphy Dome, and other outlying oil Fields in eastern Hot Springs County.

Major intersections

References

External links

 Wyoming State Routes 100-199
 WYO 172 - US 20/WYO 789 to Black Mountain Rd

Transportation in Hot Springs County, Wyoming
173